Vladimír Žemba (born November 10, 1988) is a Slovak professional ice hockey player who played with HK SKP Poprad in the Slovak Extraliga during the 2010–11 season.

References

External links

Living people
HK Poprad players
Slovak ice hockey forwards
Year of birth missing (living people)

1988 births
Ice hockey forwards
Slovak ice hockey biography stubs